CLaMS (Chemical Lagrangian Model of the Stratosphere) is a modular chemistry transport model (CTM) system developed at Forschungszentrum Jülich, Germany.  CLaMS was first described by McKenna et al. (2000a,b) and was expanded into three dimensions by Konopka et al. (2004).  CLaMS has been employed in recent European field campaigns THESEO, EUPLEX, TROCCINOX SCOUT-O3, and RECONCILE with a focus on simulating ozone depletion and water vapour transport.   

Major strengths of CLaMS in comparison to other CTMs are 
 its applicability for reverse domain filling studies
 its anisotropic mixing scheme
 its integrability with arbitrary observational data
 its comprehensive chemistry scheme

CLaMS gridding 

Unlike other CTMs (e.g. SLIMCAT, REPROBUS), CLaMS operates on a Lagrangian model grid (see section about model grids in general circulation model):  an air parcel is described by three space coordinates and a time coordinate.  The time evolution path that an air parcels traces in space is called a trajectory.  A specialised mixing scheme ensures that physically realistic diffusion is imposed on an ensemble of
trajectories in regions of high wind shear. 

CLaMS operates on arbitrarily resolved horizontal grids.  The space coordinates are latitude, longitude and potential temperature.

CLaMS hierarchy 

CLaMS is composed of four modules and several preprocessors. The four modules are
 a trajectory module
 a box chemistry module
 a Lagrangian mixing module
 a Lagrangian sedimentation scheme

Trajectory module 
Integration of trajectories with 4th order  Runge-Kutta method, integration time step 30 minutes. Vertical displacement of trajectories is calculated from radiation budget.

Box chemistry module 

Chemistry is based on the ASAD chemistry code of the University of Cambridge.  More than 100 chemical reactions involving 40+ chemical
species are considered.  Integration time step is 10 minutes, species
can be combined into chemical families to facilitate integration.  The
module includes a radiative transfer model for the determination of
photolysis rates. The module also includes heterogeneous reactions on
NAT, ice and liquid particle surfaces.

Lagrangian mixing 
Mixing is based on grid deformation of quasi uniform air parcel
distributions.  The contraction or elongation factors of the distances
to neighboring air parcels are examined: if a critical elongation
(contraction) is reached, new air parcels are introduced (taken away).
This way, anisotropic diffusion is simulated in a physically realistic
manner.

Lagrangian sedimentation 

Lagrangian sedimentation is calculated by following individual nitric
acid trihydrate (NAT) particles that may grow or shrink by the uptake
or release of HNO3 from/to the gas phase. These particle parcels are
simulated independently from the Lagrangian air parcels. Their
trajectories are determined using the horizontal winds and their
vertical settling velocity that depends on the size of the individual
particles.  NAT particles are nucleated assuming a constant nucleation
rate and they evaporate where temperatures grow too high.  With this,
a vertical redistribution of HNO3 (denitrification and
renitrification) is determined.

CLaMS data sets 

A chemical transport model does not simulate the dynamics of the atmosphere.  For CLaMS, the following meteorological data sets have been used
  European Centre for Medium-Range Weather Forecasts (ECMWF), Predictions, Analyses, ERA-15, ERA-40
  United Kingdom Met Office (UKMO)
  European Centre Hamburg Atmospheric Model (ECHAM4), in the DLR version

To initialize the chemical fields in CLaMS, data from a large variety of instruments have provided data.
 on satellite (CRISTA, MIPAS, MLS, HALOE, ILAS, ...), 
 on aircraft and balloons (HALOX, FISH, Mark IV, BONBON...)

If no observations are present, the chemical fields can be initialised
from two-dimensional chemical models, chemistry-climate models,
climatologies, or from correlations between chemical species or
chemical species and dynamical variables.

See also

Forschungszentrum Jülich
Ozone depletion
Meteorology

External links 
CLaMS at Forschungszentrum Jülich
Current field campaign SCOUT-O3

References 
The details of the model CLaMS are well documented and published in the scientific literature. 

Formulation of advection and mixing by McKenna et al., 2002a 
Formulation of chemistry-scheme and initialisation by McKenna et al., 2002b

Comparison of the chemistry module with other stratospheric models by  Krämer et al., 2003
Calculation of photolysis rates by Becker et al., 2000
Extension to 3-dimension model version by Konopka et al., 2004
Lagrangian sedimentation by Grooß et al., 2005

Numerical climate and weather models
Ozone depletion